Transcorp Hotels Plc, formerly Transnational Hospitality & Tourism Services Limited (THTSL), is the hospitality subsidiary of  Transnational Corporation of Nigeria Plc (Transcorp), a conglomerate with interests in the power, hospitality, agriculture, and oil and gas sectors, headquartered in Lagos. It was listed on the Nigerian Stock Exchange in January 2015.

Transcorp has a property in Abuja; the Transcorp Hilton Hotel Abuja, a destination hotel in Calabar; Transcorp Hotels Calabar, and planned properties in Lagos and Port Harcourt,

History 
In 2005, the Federal Government of Nigeria privatized NIRMSCO Properties Limited – the owner of the Nicon Hilton Hotel, Abuja at the time. As part of a consortium, Transcorp plc purchased a proprietary stake in the company and became the core investor, while the federal government retained the remaining 49 per cent. Hilton International LLC was engaged to manage the property.

In 2007, the name NIRMSCO Properties Limited was changed to Transnational Hotels & Tourism Services Limited (THTSL). THTSL was the hospitality subsidiary of Transcorp.

In 2013, Transcorp bought out other consortium members and became the sole owner of the 51 per cent controlling shares in THTSL. It secured hosting rights for the World Economic Forum on Africa in 2014.

THTSL was rebranded Transcorp Hotels plc in 2014, ahead of an initial public offering in October 2014.

In July 2021, Transcorp Hotels plc launched Aura by Transcorp Hotels, an online platform for booking unique accommodation, including hotels and apartments, ordering great food, as well as experiences.

References

Hotels in Nigeria